This is a list of topics named after the Greek mathematician Euclid.

Mathematics

Number theory

 Euclidean algorithm
 Extended Euclidean algorithm
 Euclidean division
 Euclid–Euler theorem
 Euclid number
 Euclid's lemma
 Euclid's orchard
 Euclid–Mullin sequence
 Euclid's theorem

Algebra

 Euclidean domain
 Euclidean field

Geometry

 Euclidean group
 Euclidean geometry
Non-Euclidean geometry
 Euclid's formula
 Euclidean distance
Euclidean distance matrix
 Euclidean space
Pseudo-Euclidean space
 Euclidean vector
 Euclidean relation
 Euclidean topology
 Euclid's fifth postulate

Other
 Euclid's Elements
 Euclid's Optics
 Euclid (spacecraft)
 Euclid, Ohio
Euclid, Minnesota
 Euclidean rhythm a term coined by Godfried Toussaint in his 2005 paper "The Euclidean Algorithm Generates Traditional Musical Rhythms"
 Euclid (computer program)
 Euclid (programming language)
 Euclid, a supercomputer built by the fictional character Maximillian Cohen in the 1998 film π
 Euclid Creek
 Euclid Avenue, a street in Manassas, Virginia
 Euclid Avenue, a street in Arlington Heights, Illinois
 Euclid Avenue, a street in Miami Beach, Florida
 Euclid Avenue, a street in Des Moines, Iowa
 Euclid St, a street in Orange County, California
 Euclid, an object designation within the SCP Foundation stories, denoting an anomaly that is difficult, but fairly straightforward to contain.
 Mount Euclid in New Zealand's Paparoa Range was named after him in 1970 by the Department of Scientific and Industrial Research.
 Euclidate

References

Euclid